The 1995 ICF Canoe Sprint World Championships were held in Duisburg, Germany for the third time. The German city had hosted the event previously in 1979 and 1987 when it was part of West Germany.

The men's competition consisted of nine Canadian (single paddle, open boat) and nine kayak events. Six events were held for the women, all in kayak.

This was the 27th championships in canoe sprint.

Medal summary

Men's

Canoe

Kayak

Women's

Kayak

Medals table

References
ICF medalists for Olympic and World Championships - Part 1: flatwater (now sprint): 1936-2007.
ICF medalists for Olympic and World Championships - Part 2: rest of flatwater (now sprint) and remaining canoeing disciplines: 1936-2007.

Icf Canoe Sprint World Championships, 1995
C
ICF Canoe Sprint World Championships
C
Canoeing and kayaking competitions in Germany